This is a list of diplomatic missions of Niger, excluding honorary consulates. Niger maintains permanent diplomatic missions in 25  nations around the world, both on the ambassadorial and the consular level. The diplomatic staff of the Republic of Niger reports to the Presidency of Niger through the Nigerien Ministry of Foreign Affairs and Cooperation (Ministère des Affaires Étrangères et de la Coopération). It belongs to the United Nations and its main specialized agencies and in 1980-81 served on the UN Security Council. Niger maintains a special relationship with France and enjoys close relations with its West African neighbours. It is a charter member of the Organisation of African Unity and the West African Monetary Union and also belongs to the Niger River Commission and the Lake Chad Basin Commission, the Economic Community of West African States, the Non-Aligned Movement, and the Organisation of the Islamic Conference.

Africa

Algiers (Embassy) 
Tamanrasset (Consulate)

Cotonou (Embassy) 

 Ouagadougou (Consulate-General)

 Yaoundé (Embassy)

 N'Djamena (Embassy)

Cairo (Embassy) 

Addis Ababa (Embassy) 

Accra (Embassy) 

 Abidjan (Embassy) 

Tripoli (Embassy) 
Sabha (Consulate)

Rabat (Embassy) 

Abuja (Embassy) 
Kano (Consulate) 

Dakar (Embassy) 

Pretoria (Embassy) 

Khartoum (Consulate-General)

Lomé (Embassy)

America

Havana (Embassy) 

 Washington, D.C. (Embassy)

Asia

Beijing (Embassy) 

 New Delhi (Embassy) 

Kuwait City (Embassy) 

Doha (Embassy) 

Riyadh (Embassy) 
Jeddah (Consulate)

Ankara (Embassy) 

 Abu Dhabi (Embassy)
Dubai (Consulate)

Europe

Brussels (Embassy) 

Copenhagen (Embassy) 

Paris (Embassy) 

Berlin (Embassy) 

Rome (Embassy)

Multilateral organisations

New York City (Delegation to the United Nations) 
Geneva (Delegation to the United Nations Office at Geneva) 

 Paris (Delegation to UNESCO)

Gallery

See also
Ambassadors of Niger to the United States
Foreign relations of Niger

References
 Ministry of Foreign Affairs of Niger

Niger
 
Diplomatic missions